Hélène Bourdages (born 31 October 1959) is a Canadian fencer. She competed in the women's team foil event at the 1992 Summer Olympics.

References

External links
 

1959 births
Living people
Canadian female foil fencers
Olympic fencers of Canada
Fencers at the 1992 Summer Olympics
20th-century Canadian women